Bhavya Gandhi (born 20 June 1997) is an Indian actor who mainly works in Hindi YouTube  and Gujarati films. He made his acting debut with and is best known for his role of Tipendra Jethalal Gada a.k.a. Tapu in the Indian sitcom Taarak Mehta Ka Ooltah Chashmah.

Bhavya made his film debut in 2017 with Pappa Tamne Nahi Samjaay and has done films like Bau Na Vichar and Baap Kamaal Dikro Dhamaal. He also appeared in Shaadi Ke Siyape.

Early and personal life
Bhavya is from a Gujarati Jain family. He lives with his parents and elder brother in Mumbai. He has completed his Bachelor of Commerce graduation. He is the maternal cousin of Samay Shah, who played his on-screen friend Gurucharan Singh Sodhi on Taarak Mehta Ka Ooltah Chashmah. Bhavya Gandhi mother's name is Yashoda Gandhi and she is a homemaker, his father's name is Vinod Gandhi who was a businessman and he also has an elder brother named Nischit Gandhi.
His father died on 12 May 2021 due to Covid related complications.

Career

Television career and success (2008–2019)
From 2008 to 2017, Gandhi appeared in the comedy show Taarak Mehta Ka Ooltah Chashmah as Tipendra Jethalal Gada (commonly known as Tappu), son of Jethalal and Daya. He left the show to pursue a career as a film actor, saying that the makers are ignoring his character in the show. Bhavya became a household name with his role of Tapu. In 2019, he appeared in the show Shaadi Ke Siyape, where he played the role of Nanku.

Film career and further success (2010–present)
Gandhi first appeared in films with the role of child lead Suryakant in the 2010 Hindi language film Striker. He also appeared in a short film Fidget Spinner as Aniket.

Bhavya made his Gujarati film debut with Pappa Tamne Nahi Samjaay, in 2017. It starred Manoj Joshi, Ketki Dave and Johny Lever and was a critical and commercial success.

In 2018, he did a Gujarati drama film Baap Kamaal Dikro Dhamaal with Dharmesh Vyas, Ragi Jani and Falguni Mistry. In 2019, he played the lead role in Gujarati film Bau Na Vichar which was a moderate success. In 2021, he appeared in the romantic movie Tari Sathe. In 2022, he acted in Gujarati comedy film  Kehvatlal Parivar.

Gandhi is set to next appear in the Gujarati film Kehvatlal Parivar and the Hindi film Doctor Doctor.

Filmography

Films

Television

Short film

Talk show

Awards

References

External links

 

Living people
Indian male television actors
Male actors from Mumbai
21st-century Indian male actors
Indian male child actors
1997 births